State Highway 7 (SH 7) is a state highway in Jharkhand, India.

Route
SH 7 originates from its junction with National Highway 20 at Hazaribagh and passes through Khapriaon, Barkagaon, Keredari, Tandwa, Khelari and terminates at its junction with National Highway 39 at Bijupada.

The total length of SH 7 is 130 km.

References

State Highways in Jharkhand